Athrips bidilatata is a moth of the family Gelechiidae. It is found in China (Gansu).

The wingspan is about 11.5 mm. The forewings are greyish white mottled with numerous black scales. There are two dark spots at the base, three black spots in the middle and two indistinct dark spots at about three-quarters. The hindwings are light grey. Adults are on wing in September and from February to May.

References

Moths described in 2009
Athrips
Moths of Asia